Maymi may refer to:

Mayaimi or Maymi
Ricky Maymi